This page covers the major events of 2016 in rugby union.

International tournaments
6 February – 6 March: 2016 Americas Rugby Championship, won by  Argentina XV
11–19 November: 2016 Cup of Nations, won by  Russia
 9–18 June: 2016 World Rugby Nations Cup, won by  Romania

Northern hemisphere national teams
 February 6 – March 19: 2016 Six Nations Championship, won by  England
 Autumn 2014 – Spring 2016: 2014–16 European Nations Cup First Division, won by  Georgia
 5 March – 1 October: 2016 Rugby Americas North Championship, won by  Mexico
 30 April – 4 June: 2016 Asia Rugby Championship in Hong Kong, Japan and South Korea; won by  Japan

Southern hemisphere national teams
 March 8–21: 2016 World Rugby Pacific Challenge, won by  Fiji Warriors
 20 August – 8 October: 2016 Rugby Championship, won by  New Zealand
 July 18 – August 3: 2016 World Rugby Pacific Nations Cup, won by  Fiji
 May 7 – June 4: 2016 Sudamérica Rugby Cup, won by  Argentina

Club tournaments

Northern hemisphere clubs
 13 November 2015 – 14 May 2016: 2015–16 European Rugby Champions Cup, won by  Saracens
12 November 2015 – 13 May 2016: 2015–16 European Rugby Challenge Cup, won by  Montpellier Hérault Rugby
 5 September 2015 – 28 May 2016: 2015–16 Pro12, won by  Connacht
 22 August 2015 – 24 June 2016: 2015–16 Top 14 season, won by  Racing 92
 16 October 2015 – 28 May 2016: 2015–16 Aviva Premiership, won by  Saracens

Southern hemisphere clubs
 February 26 – August 6: 2016 Super Rugby season, won by  Hurricanes

Youth tournaments
 April 19 – May 1: 2016 World Rugby Under 20 Trophy in Zimbabwe, won by  Samoa
 3–7 May: 2016 Oceania Rugby Under 20 Championship in Australia and New Zealand, won by  New Zealand
 June 7–25: 2016 World Rugby Under 20 Championship in England, won by  England
 11–17 December: 2016 U-19 Asia Rugby Championship in Malaysia, won by  Hong Kong

Women's rugby
 5 February – 20 March: 2016 Women's Six Nations Championship, won by  France
 6–15 October: 2016 Women's European Championship in Spain, won by  Spain
 6–8 August: Rugby sevens at the 2016 Summer Olympics – Women's tournament, won by  Australia

Rugby sevens 
 4 Dec 2015 – 22 May 2016: 2015–16 World Rugby Sevens Series, won by  Fiji
 9–11 August: Rugby sevens at the 2016 Summer Olympics – Men's tournament, won by  Fiji

See also
2016 in sports

References

 
Years of the 21st century in rugby union